S/2015 (136472) 1, nicknamed MK2 by the discovery team, is the only known moon of the trans-Neptunian dwarf planet Makemake. It is estimated to be  in diameter (for an assumed albedo of 4%) and has a semi-major axis at least  from Makemake. Its orbital period is ≥ 12 days (the minimum values are those for a circular orbit; the actual orbital eccentricity is unknown). Observations leading to its discovery occurred in April 2015, using the Hubble Space Telescope Wide Field Camera 3, and its discovery was announced on 26 April 2016.

The discovery of MK2 and follow-up observations in 2018 will enable Makemake's mass to be determined, which will allow an estimate of its density and other characteristics.

Observations 
A preliminary examination of the discovery imagery suggests that MK2 has a reflectivity similar to charcoal, making it an extremely dark object. This is somewhat surprising because Makemake is the second-brightest-known object in the Kuiper belt. One hypothesis to explain this is that its gravity is not strong enough to prevent bright but volatile ices from being lost to space when it is heated by the distant Sun.

Alex Parker, the leader of the team that performed the analysis of the discovery images at the Southwest Research Institute, said that from the discovery images, MK2's orbit appears to be aligned edge-on to Earth-based observatories. This would make it difficult to detect because it would be lost in Makemake's glare much of the time, which, along with its dark surface, would contribute to previous surveys failing to observe it. Observations taken in 2018 and 2019 may be enough to determine whether the orbit is close to circular, which would suggest that MK2 was formed by an ancient impact event, or if it is significantly elliptical, which would suggest that it was captured.

Name 

The nickname 'MK2' simply means object 2 in the Makemake system. A permanent name may be chosen from an associated figure in the mythology of Easter Island.

Notes

References

External links 
MPEC 2016-H46 : S/2015 (136472) 1, Minor Planet Center, 26 April 2016

Makemake
Astronomical objects discovered in 2015
Trans-Neptunian satellites
Moons of dwarf planets